United Blood is the debut EP 7" from New York hardcore band Agnostic Front. It was released in 1983 on their own AF Records label. 1000 copies in total pressed.

In 2009 Bridge9 re-released the first authorized vinyl release of Agnostic Front's "United Blood" EP in almost 14 years, to recognize the 25th anniversary since the original release of Victim in Pain in 1984.

Track listing

Credits
 Roger Miret – vocals
 Vinnie Stigma – guitars
 Adam Mucci – bass
 Ray Barbieri – drums
 Recorded at Demo Studios, New York City, U.S.
 Produced and mixed by Don Fury

References

External links
http://www.7inchpunk.com/?p=36
Agnostic Front official website

Agnostic Front albums